Nea Mesimvria is a village in the west suburbs of Thessaloniki, Greece. It is part of the municipality Chalkidona. Its population was 3,050 in 2011.

References

Populated places in Thessaloniki (regional unit)